Aralsor is a bittern salt lake group in Bokey Orda  District, West Kazakhstan Region, Kazakhstan.

The road connects Saykyn station of the Volga Railway near lake Botkul with the village of Taipak on the right bank of the Ural River. Salt extraction on an industrial scale is carried out at the lake.

Geography
Lying at the northern edge of the Ryn Desert, east of the Russian border, Aralsor is an endorheic lake group. The main water body is colored pink and is surrounded by a string of smaller lakes and salt pans. The latter contain clay salt-mud deposits covered with a crust of halite reaching . The western and eastern banks of Aralsor are steep and cliff-like in places.

Flowing from the north, the Ashchyozek is the main river feeding the waters of Aralsor. The channels connecting the river with the lake are periodically dry. The Kamys-Samar Lakes lie to the east.

Flora and fauna
There is desert and steppe vegetation in the terraced flat areas of the Aralsor lakeside cliff-like formations. In the ravines of the shoreline cliffs there are plants such as tamarisk, anabasis, Halocnemum and winterfat, providing a habitat and breeding ground for the local fauna of small mammals, birds and reptiles.

See also
List of lakes of Kazakhstan
Pink lake

References

External links

Tourism and recreational potential of the salt lakes of Western Kazakhstan

Lake groups of Kazakhstan
Endorheic lakes of Asia
West Kazakhstan Region
Caspian Depression

cs:Aralsor
ka:არალსორი
kk:Аралсор (көл, Бөкей ордасы ауданы)
lt:Aralsoras
ru:Аралсор